Pseudolilliconus is a genus of sea snails, marine gastropod mollusks in the  family Conidae, the cone snails and their allies.

Species
 Pseudolilliconus boschorum (Moolenbeek & Coomans, 1993) represented as Conus boschorum Moolenbeek & Coomans, 1993 (alternate representation)
 Pseudolilliconus korni (G. Raybaudi Massilia, 1993) represented as Conus korni G. Raybaudi Massilia, 1993 (alternate representation)
 Pseudolilliconus kuiperi (Moolenbeek, 2006) represented as Conus kuiperi Moolenbeek, 2006 (alternate representation)
Synonyms
 Pseudolilliconus levis Bozzetti, 2012: synonym of Conus (Pseudolilliconus) levis (Bozzetti, 2012) represented as Conus levis (Bozzetti, 2012)
 Pseudolilliconus scalarispira Bozzetti, 2012: synonym of Conus (Pseudolilliconus) scalarispira (Bozzetti, 2012) represented as Conus scalarispira (Bozzetti, 2012)
 Pseudolilliconus traillii (A. Adams, 1855) represented as Conus traillii A. Adams, 1855 (alternate representation)
 Pseudolilliconus visseri (Delsaerdt, 1990) represented as Conus visseri Delsaerdt, 1990 (alternate representation)
 Pseudolilliconus wallacei (Lorenz & Morrison, 2004) represented as Conus wallacei (Lorenz & Morrison, 2004) (alternate representation)

References

 Monnier E., Limpalaër L., Robin A. & Roux C. (2018). A taxonomic iconography of living Conidae. Harxheim: ConchBooks. 2 vols. 1205 pp.

External links
 To World Register of Marine Species

Conidae